Thomas Bindon, LL.D (1685 - 1740) was an Eighteenth Century Irish Anglican priest.

After graduating from  Trinity College, Dublin, he was Rector of Aghalurcher then Dean of Limerick.

References

Irish Anglicans
Deans of Limerick
1740 deaths
1685 births